The 1980 Holly Farms 400 was a NASCAR Winston Cup Series racing event that took place on September 21, 1980, at North Wilkesboro Speedway in North Wilkesboro, North Carolina. Its total prize purse was finalized as $105,515 ($ when adjusted for inflation); with the winner taking home $17,725 ($ when adjusted for inflation).

By 1980, NASCAR had completely stopped tracking the year model of all the vehicles and most teams did not take stock cars to the track under their own power anymore.

The NASCAR Winston Cup Series was also plagued with top teams running big engines and finishing in third place to avoid inspection around the early-1980s.

Background
During the 1980s, North Wilkesboro Speedway was noticeably lagging behind other speedways on the NASCAR circuit, but the fans were more interested in the great racing action between the legendary drivers. Enoch's focus was more on the fans' enjoyment rather than on building large suites and new facilities. Attendance and total purse for races at the track were the lowest in NASCAR, but the events continued to sell out and attract more fans each year.

Race report
Just months prior to the race, a new kind of asphalt was placed but did not get a chance to completely solve the disintegration problem. The racetrack developed a slick surface; that made qualifying speeds  slower and the cars more likely to spin and crash with each other. Conditions for the race would become very poor by the standards of the early 1980s; causing the pace car to crash into a parked car getting back into pit lane.

Richard Childress, the current owner of Richard Childress Racing, would compete as a driver. There were 30 American-born drivers on the racing grid; no foreigners or women competed in this race. Bobby Allison managed to defeat Darrell Waltrip by half a second after more than three hours of racing. Cale Yarborough would acquire the pole position through driving his qualifying session at an incredible top speed of almost .

Bobby Allison scores his last win for Bud Moore and his last in a Mord Motor Company product. This was his fourth win of 1980. Future 2-time Whelen Southern Modified Tour champion Junior Miller scores his best Winston Cup finish in 13th. Slick Johnson scores a career-best 8th place finish, he'd later match it at Rockingham three races later.

Another Ford vehicle would not win another race until the 1990 Tyson Holly Farms 400.

D.K. Ulrich received credit for the last-place finish due to an oil pressure problem on the second lap of this 400-lap race. Nine drivers failed to complete the race; including legends such as J.D. McDuffie, Lake Speed and Lennie Pond. Bub Strickler would retire from NASCAR after this race. Dale Earnhardt would maintain his championship points lead after this event.

Two months after the race, the track was treated again. The disintegration issue managed to solve itself throughout the harsh winter months and was completely prepared for the 1981 season.

Notable crew chiefs who participated in the race were Junie Donlavey, Buddy Parrott, Joey Arrington, Darrell Bryant, Dale Inman, Bud Moore, Tim Brewer, and Kirk Shelmerdine.

Qualifying

Top 10 finishers

Standings after the race

References

Holly Farms 400
Holly Farms 400
NASCAR races at North Wilkesboro Speedway